Všechno nejlepší!  is a Czech comedy film. It was released in 2006.

Cast
 Jan Dolanský
 Viktor Preiss
 Pavel Zedníček
 Vendula Křížová
 Jaromír Dulava
 Jana Hlaváčová
 Tereza Kostková
 Pavel Šimčík
 Adéla Gondíková
 Jana Štěpánková
 Alice Bendová
 Naďa Konvalinková
 Tomáš Matonoha
 Izabela Kapiasová
 Miriam Kantorková
 Jitka Nováková
 Emil Linka

External links
 

2006 films
2006 comedy films
Czech comedy films
2000s Czech films